Gygaea or Gygaia may refer to:

Lake Gygaea, or Gygaia, an ancient name of Lake Marmara in Manisa Turkey.
Gygaea of Macedon daughter of Amyntas I